Bonita is a village in Morehouse Parish, Louisiana, United States. The population was 335 at the 2000 census. It is part of the Bastrop Micropolitan Statistical Area.

History
Bonita was founded in the early 1890s when the railroad was extended to that point. A post office has been in operation in Bonita since 1890.

Geography
Bonita is located at  (32.921780, -91.673838).

Demographics

As of the census of 2000, there were 335 people, 122 households, and 87 families residing in the village. The racial makeup of the village was 42.69% White, 55.52% African American, 0.30% Asian, 1.49% from other races. Hispanic or Latino of any race were 1.49% of the population.

There were 122 households, out of which 30.3% had children under the age of 18 living with them, 50.0% were married couples living together, 16.4% had a female householder with no husband present, and 27.9% were non-families. 25.4% of all households were made up of individuals, and 14.8% had someone living alone who was 65 years of age or older. The average household size was 2.75 and the average family size was 3.35.

In the village, the population was spread out, with 26.9% under the age of 18, 8.7% from 18 to 24, 23.0% from 25 to 44, 22.4% from 45 to 64, and 19.1% who were 65 years of age or older. The median age was 39 years. For every 100 females, there were 92.5 males. For every 100 females age 18 and over, there were 91.4 males.

The median income for a household in the village was $22,727, and the median income for a family was $25,227. Males had a median income of $19,167 versus $19,688 for females. The per capita income for the village was $25,029. About 25.0% of families and 30.1% of the population were below the poverty line, including 37.6% of those under age 18 and 27.0% of those age 65 or over.

References

External links
 Bonita Progress Community Progress Site for Bonita, LA

Villages in Morehouse Parish, Louisiana
Villages in Louisiana